The Upper Lott's Creek Primitive Baptist Church and Cemetery is a historic site in Upper Lotts Creek or Upper Lott's Creek in Metter, Georgia.  It was added to the National Register of Historic Places on December 4, 2008. It is located on the Metter-Portal Highway and Westside Road.

The one-room, one-story church, built in 1881, has elements of Greek Revival style.  An annex was added to the rear, in 1959.

As of 2008 the cemetery had 328 marked graves, dating back to 1902, but also had unmarked plots that may go back as far as 1841.

See also
 National Register of Historic Places listings in Bulloch County, Georgia

References

Properties of religious function on the National Register of Historic Places in Georgia (U.S. state)
Cemeteries on the National Register of Historic Places in Georgia (U.S. state)
Religious buildings and structures completed in 1881
Buildings and structures in Bulloch County, Georgia
Baptist churches in Georgia (U.S. state)
Greek Revival architecture in Georgia (U.S. state)
Primitive Baptists